Association of Private Higher Education Institutions of Thailand (APHEIT) established in 1979, is a non-profit association founded by a group of private higher education institutions in Thailand to establish and promote cooperation among private higher education institutions in the country. APHEIT is recognized by Ministry of Education (Thailand) as one of the organizations that plays an important role in Thailand's university administration.

History

In 1967, six administrators from private colleges established a club in which they met monthly to discuss and exchange views on administrative problems in each institution. This club was later renamed to Association of Private Colleges of Thailand on November 18, 1977. On July 23, 1979, it was again renamed to Association of Private Higher Education of Thailand to conform with the Private Higher Education Institution Act of 1979.

Members
There are 65 member institutions:

 Arsom Silp Institute of the Arts
 Asia-Pacific International University
 Assumption University (Thailand) (ABAC)
 Bangkok Suvarnabhumi University
 Bangkok Thonburi University
 Bangkok University
 Chalermkarnchana College
 Chalermkarnchana Rayong College
 Chaopraya University
 Chiangrai College
 Christian University of Thailand
 Chulabhorn Graduate Institute
 College of Asian Scholars
 Dhurakij Pundit University
 Dusit Thani College
 Eastern Asia University
 Faculty of Pharmaceutical Sciences Huachiew Chalermprakiet University
 Hatyai University
 International Buddhist College
 Kasem Bundit University
 Krirk University
 Lampang Inter-Tech College
 Lumnamping College
 Mahanakorn University of Technology
 Nakhon Ratchasima College
 Nation University
 North Bangkok University
 North Chiang Mai University
 North Eastern University
 Panyapiwat Institute of Management
 Pathumthani University
 Payap University
 Phitsanulok University
 Phanomwan College of Technology
 Rajapruk University
 Rangsit University
 Ratchaphruek College
 Ratchathani University
 Rattana Bundit University
 Saengtham College
 Saint John's University
 Saint Louis College
 Santapol College
 Shinawatra University
 Siam Technological College
 Siam University
 South-East Asia University
 Southeast Bangkok College
 Southern College of Technology
 Sripatum University
 Stamford International University
 St Theresa International College
 Suwannabhumi College
 Tapee College
 Thai-Nichi Institute of Technology
 The Eastern University of Management and Technology
 The Far Eastern University
 The University of Central Thailand
 Thonburi University
 Thongsuk College
 University of the Thai Chamber of Commerce
 Vongchavalitkul University
 Webster University Thailand
 Western University
 Yala Islamic University

References

External links
 Official Website

Institutions
Organizations established in 1979
1979 establishments in Thailand